The General Manuscript Collection of the National Library of Wales includes three series of manuscripts: NLW Manuscript series; NLW ex series of Manuscripts; and, NLW Rolls. All manuscripts acquired by the library through either donation or purchase are added to this open-ended series, either singly or in groups, if they are: a) in a format compatible with the collection, i.e. manuscript books or rolls, or unbound material that can be filed; and, b) not integral to an archive or individual collection. There is, however, much archival material, mostly correspondence, held in the General Manuscripts Collection. The holdings in the General Manuscript Collection are catalogued in the Handlist of manuscripts in the National Library of Wales, which focuses on those manuscripts in the National Library which are not part of the foundation collections; there were over fifteen thousand when the first volume of the handlist appeared in 1940, and the collection had increased to 23,233 by 31 March 1994.

Welsh Law Manuscripts 

NLW MS 20143, Ancient laws and institutions in Wales “Leges Wallicae Saec 13[sic]”, is a fourteenth century text of the Welsh Laws, known as Siglum Y. This calf bound volume has the unusual feature of marginalia drawings, mostly religious, including shield, a mermaid, evangelist-symbols and, the crucifixion with the Virgin Mary and John. The Boston Manuscript of the Laws of Hywel Dda is also in the General Manuscript Collection (NLW MS 24029).

Additional Manuscripts (NLW MSS 1-500) 
The Additional Manuscripts are those donated to the National Library of Wales by Sir John Williams that are not part of either the Peniarth or Llanstephan collections. These manuscripts are the first five hundred in the General Collection (NLW 1-500), of which 1-446 were catalogued by John Humphreys Davies, Principal of the University College of Wales in Aberystwyth, in Additional manuscripts in the collections of Sir John Williams. 

A hundred and thirty-seven of the Additional Manuscripts were purchased at the Sir Thomas Phillipps sale in 1895, which Davies described as including some of considerable interest, for instance the letters contained in bound volumes of the papers of Bardd y Brenin, that Sir Thomas had bought. There are also some important manuscripts such as the holograph of George Owen's Treatise on the Lordships Marcher of Wales (NLW MS 10), a collection of notes by Lewis Morris (NLW MS 67), a copy of the journal that Sir Joseph Banks kept of his tour through Wales (NLW MS 147), a copy of the original manuscript of T. F. Dukes's Antiquities of Shropshire, the notebook of Theophilus Jones (NLW MS 235), and a volume of letters to the Welsh Antiquary Edward Lhuyd (NLW MS 309).

Some forty of the manuscripts are from Egerton Phillimore's collection including Irish and Manx manuscripts. Among this group is the volume of poetry written by Thomas Evans in the early seventeenth century (NLW MS 253), which Davies suggests is the smallest Welsh manuscript in existence, measuring 85 x 70 mm. More than fifty manuscripts are the books and papers of Thomas Rees including a holograph of poetry by Vavasor Powel (NLW MS 366), the Register of Mynydd Bach Chapel, Llangyfelach (NLW MS 369), and letters to the managers of the Congregational Fund 1769-1811 (NLW MS 383).

Other groups within the Additional Manuscripts are the collections of Thomas Edwards (NLW MSS 346-354), George Dunn (NLW MS 431-436), and four French manuscripts (NLW MSS 443-446) acquired at the Ashburnham sale in 1899. Notable individual manuscripts are two books of hymns scribed by William Williams (NLW MSS 77-78) and one written by his son Rev. John Williams (NLW MS 269), both of Pantycelyn; holograph copies by nineteenth century celebrities including Talhaiarn (NLW MS 192) and Ceiriog (NLW MS 307); and, a book of Manx Carols owned by George Borrow (NLW MS 409).

Seven continental liturgical manuscripts (NLW MSS 493-499), including examples of fifteenth century illumination from Italian, French and Netherlandish schools, were purchased from Sir Edmund Buckley of Plas Dinas Mawddwy in 1912.

Aberaeron Manuscripts (NLW MSS 609-23) 
The Aberaeron Manuscripts, which previously belonged to Thomas Davies, Aberaeron, were acquired by the National Library in 1909. They include poems, sermons, accounts and other records of the parish of Ystrad, a roll of members of the Llyfr Cymdeithas Grefyddol society at Llanddewi, Aberarth between 1812 and 1824, and books of the Aberaeron Club, 1795-1849.

Plas Power (NLW MSS 716-36) 

The Plas Power collection of manuscripts was formed in the early eighteenth century at the Lloyd family home of Plas Power. The National Library of Wales acquired the collection in 1913. It includes an eleventh century volume of astronomy, an early fifteenth century text of Piers Plowman (NLW MS 733B), and collections of Welsh poetry and pedigrees from the sixteenth and seventeenth century.
 NLW MS 733B is a composite volume of Piers Plowman that is connected with groups A and C of the medieval poem.
 NLW MS 735C is an illustrated volume of medieval astronomy texts that were copied c. 1000 to c. 1150. It is the oldest scientific manuscript in the library.

Ty Coch Manuscripts (NLW MSS 815-68) 
These manuscripts were part of the Ty Coch Library that was purchased from Edward Humphrey Owen of Ty Coch, Caernarvon in 1910 as the third foundation collection of the National Library of Wales. Although the collection's printed books are its primary feature, it does contain several historical manuscripts relating to Anglesey and Caernarvonshire, and Llyfr Gwyn Mechell (NLW MS 832), a literary collection compiled by William Bulkeley of Brynddu in around 1730.

Thomas Stephens Manuscripts (NLW MSS 904-66) 
The manuscripts from the library of Thomas Stephens, a chemist from Merthyr Tydfil, were bequeathed to the National Library by his brother-in-law and four additional volumes enriched the collection on the death his sister in 1939. Stephens was the author of The Literature of the Kymry, an important book in nineteenth century Wales that was published in 1849. Most of this group of manuscripts are in the hand of Thomas Stephens.

Henry Owen Manuscripts (NLW MSS 1341-1453) 
The manuscripts bequeathed to the National Library of Wales by Dr Henry Owen, who was the Treasurer of the National Library from 1907 until his death in 1919, and editor of George Owen of Henllys, the Elizabethan historian of Pembrokeshire, include a collection of the latter's work. Henry Owen acquired two original manuscripts, Pembrock and Kemes (NLW MS 1385) and Fragmentes of Wales ... (NLW MS 1388), by George Owen and there are also a number of transcripts of other his works that were made in the eighteenth and nineteenth centuries.

Crosswood Manuscripts (NLW MSS 1641-1952) 
The Crosswood manuscripts, named for their former home in Montgomeryshire, consist of the manuscripts of Gwallter Mechain (MSS. 1641-1812 and 1950-2), Rev. John Jenkins (MSS 1813-86) and Frances Althea Trevor (MSS. 1887-1949). Among these manuscripts is a collection of sermons in Welsh and English, mostly from the eighteenth century but with one example as early as 1682, that usually bear the location and date that they were delivered.

Panton Manuscripts (NLW MSS 1970-2068) 

The Panton Manuscripts primarily consist of the papers and transcriptions of the eighteenth century Welsh scholar Evan Evans Ieuan Brydydd Hir), that were acquired by his patron Paul Panton, Plas Gwyn, Anglesey when Evans died. During the nineteenth century Panton's descendants refused to allow scholars to access the manuscripts. They were purchased by the National Library of Wales in 1914.

Evans visited many libraries in Wales, including Hengwrt and Wynnstay, to transcribe rare Welsh manuscripts in order to preserve their literary content. The volumes include genealogies, poetry, pedigrees and Brut y Tywysogion.

Further items from the collections of Paul Panton, which were hitherto unknown, were purchased by Sir Herbert Lewis and presented to the National Library in 1919. The Panton Papers (NLW MSS 9051-9105), includes the Wynn of Gwydir family papers and Robert Vaughan's manuscript catalogue of the Hengwrt-Peniarth Library (NLW MS 9095B), which shows that the Peniarth Manuscripts have survived almost intact since c.1659.

Mostyn Manuscripts (NLW MSS 3020-76)
Fifty-six of the fifty-seven Welsh manuscripts from the collection of Lord Mostyn, Mostyn Hall that were catalogued in the Report on Manuscripts in the Welsh Language by J. Gwenogvryn Evans are now in the National Library. Cyril Wright purchased this group of the Mostyn Welsh manuscripts and presented them to the Library in 1918, as the collection was being broken up and sold.

A manuscript by Gutun Owain (NLW MS 3026) is unusual by the standards of medieval Welsh manuscripts as it contains colour illustration. It was produced between 1488 and 1498 and contains texts about astrology, a calendar, a treatise on urine, the life of St. Martin, and  genealogy and history from Adam to Asclobitotus. The volume, well bound in white vellum, was Mostyn Library MS 88 and had previously been kept in the Gloddaeth Library, which was part of Mostyn estate.

Bourdillon Manuscripts (NLW MSS 5001-48) 

These manuscripts were part of the library of Francis William Bourdillon that the National Library of Wales purchased in 1922. Bourdillon had collected materials for the study of medieval French romance and manuscripts from the thirteenth century onwards can be found in this collection, including several fourteenth century editions of the Roman de la Rose. In addition to the original medieval manuscripts, there are also transcripts, translations and notes from Bourdillion's research contained in this group of manuscripts.

Dingestow Court Manuscripts (NLW MSS 5261-75) 
This group of manuscripts, which Sir John Bernard Bosanquet collected at Dingestow Court, Monmouthshire, was acquired in 1916. It includes an early Welsh translation of Geoffrey of Monmouth's Historia Regum Britanniae (NLW MSS 5266B), written in the fourteenth century. It was subsequently edited by Henry Lewis and published under the title of Brut Dingestow by the University of Wales Press in 1942.

Henry Taylor Manuscripts (NLW MSS 6267-6331) 
Henry Taylor transferred his collection of books and documents relating to the history of Flintshire to the National Library of Wales to form the basis of a historical collection for the County of Flint. The collection includes Taylor's notes and copies of documents concerning the County, the Minute Book of the Court of Great Sessions  for the County of Flint 1705 to 1756, and a scrapbook containing material relating to the 500th anniversary of the confinement of Richard II at Flint Castle.

Griffith of Cae Cyriog Manuscripts (NLW MSS 7006-10) 
This small group of manuscripts, which had previously belonged to John Griffith of Cae Cyriog, include the Black Book of Basingwerk (NLW MS 7006), a seventeenth century transcript of Pum Llyfyr Kerddwriaeth in the hand of John Jones, Gellilyfdy (NLW MS 7007), and pedigrees relating to the Griffith family and other North Wales families. They became the property of the National Library in 1933 but had been a deposit in the library since 1910.

The Black Book of Basingwerk is a Welsh language text of Geoffrey of Monmouth’s Historia Regum Britanniae, the latter section was written by Gutun Owain, who was associated with Basingwerk Abbey, in the fifteenth century.

Verney Music Manuscripts (NLW MSS 10918-30) 
The Verney Music Manuscript Collection, which was donated by Margaret Maria Verney in 1923, provides an insight into the musical interests of the nobility during the eighteenth and nineteenth centuries. The earliest manuscript is MS 10929 which dates from 1732. It belonged to Mary Nicholson, who was a harpsichord pupil of Maurice Green, and contains eighteen original keyboard compositions by Green. There are forty-two harpsichord pieces in total, including some of the most popular music of the period by Corelli, Handel, Bononcini, Porpora, Hasse and Araja. The manuscript contains the hand of William Boyce, who was Green's pupil, in addition to those of Nicholson and Green.

Alcwyn Evans Manuscripts (NLW MSS 12366-12388) 
Alcwyn Caryni Evans (1827-1902) was an  antiquary with a particular interest in the history of Carmarthen. Evans collected a considerable amount of material related to this town and county and he produced twelve large, beautifully written volumes of transcriptions and research findings. These manuscripts include transcriptions of, and extracts from, borough records, parish registers, church records, inscriptions and epitaphs in churches and churchyards, poems, and the accounts of the Carmarthen Literary and Scientific Institution; historical and architectural notes on castles, and notes concerning the Rebecca Riots, are also present. In 1867 Alcwyn Evans was awarded a gold medal at the National Eisteddfod for his manuscript work A History of the Town and County of Caermarthen, which is present in this group. There are also two volumes of genealogical material such as pedigrees.

The manuscripts were purchased and donated to the National Library of Wales by R. J. R. Loxdale at a Sotheby's sale on 18 July 1939.

Wigfair Manuscripts (NLW MSS 12401-513) 
The manuscripts from John Lloyd's library at Wigfair is rich in autograph letters from the late sixteenth century through to the mid-nineteenth century. The earliest letters are those written in Welsh by the poet Sion Tudur and there are many letters addressed to Lloyd during the eighteenth and nineteenth centuries by well known correspondents including seventy letters from the President of the Royal Society, Sir Joseph Banks. Other letters were sent by the diarist R. F. Greville, Sir William Herschel, Jonas Dryander, Sir George Shuckburgh-Evelyn,  Astronomer Royal Nevil Maskelyne, Sir Henry Engefield, Sir Charles Blagden, Sir John Rennie, Samuel Lysons, Thomas Pennant, Philip Yorke, Dean Shipley, Daines Barrington, Gwallter Mechain and a number of bishops.

In addition to the letters written to John Lloyd, there are others, from around 1770 to 1781,  addressed to his father Howel Lloyd, his mother, Dorothea Lloyd, and his sisters Susannah and Phoebe Lloyd. Earlier letters, from between 1676 to 1710, to Edward Lloyd form a large group and those sent to Maurice Wynn Groom of His Majesty's Privy Chamber between 1661 and 1678 are also of interest. There are also groups of letters related to the Howard and Conway families who were linked to the Lloyd family by marriage.

Llanover Manuscripts (NLW MSS 13061-184) 
In 1916 Sir Ivor Herbert deposited the Llanover Manuscripts in the National Library and his daughter the Hon. Fflorens Roch later converted the deposit into a donation. The Llanover Manuscripts comprise seventy-seven volumes of notes, transcripts and compositions in the hand of Edward Williams (Iolo Morganwg) on a wide variety of subjects including druid mythology, bardism, fruit culture, geology and medicine, and more than forty further volumes of Welsh manuscripts dating from the late sixteenth to mid-eighteenth century and mostly originating in Glamorgan, which Iolo Morganwg acquired.

Mysevin Manuscripts (NLW MSS 13221-13263) 
The Mysevin manuscript collection of forty-two volumes was assembled by the lexicographer, antiquary and littérateur William Owen-Pughe. There are over 700 letters addressed to Owen-Pughe by prominent figures in the cultural life of England and Wales including: Owain Myfyr, over seventy letters from Iolo Morganwg, Gwallter Mechain, Siôn Ceiriog, William Jones (Llangadfan), Thomas Pennant, Paul Panton,  Hugh Davies, Theophilus Jones, Edward Davies, Richard Fenton, Richard Llwyd, Twm o'r Nant, David Samwell, Dafydd Ddu Eryri, Thomas Johnes, Sir Richard Colt Hoare, Joseph Allen, Thomas Charles, J. R. Jones, W. Richards, Morgan John Rhys, Hugh Jones, Sir Walter Scott, George Chalmers, William Coxe, and Joanna Southcott.

Another group of manuscripts document the activities of the Gwyneddigion, Cymreigyddion, and Cymmrodorion Societies in the eighteenth and nineteenth centuries. Further manuscripts consist of the transcripts of Welsh poetry taken by Owen-Pughe and miscellaneous volumes and papers that he acquired.

Sherbrooke Missal and De Grey Hours (NLW MSS 15536-7) 

The Sherbrooke Missal and De Grey Hours were both part of the manuscript collection of Henry Yates Thompson that was sold by Sotheby's in 1920. Gwendoline Davies purchased both of these manuscripts at the auction and they were donated to the Library by Margaret Davies in 1951.

The Sherbrooke Missal (NLW MS 15536E) is one of the earliest Missals of English origin. It was made in East Anglia sometime around 1310 to 1320. The manuscript's parchment leaves are beautifully embellished with an unusual amount of illuminated miniatures, which add its importance. From the sixteenth to the nineteenth century the manuscript was kept in the Sherbrooke family library in Oxton, Nottinghamshire before it passed into the ownership of the artist William Morris. Manuscript collector Henry Yates Thompson brought the Sherbrooke Missal and retained ownership until it was auctioned by Sotheby's in 1920.

The 'De Grey' Hours (NLW MS 15537C) is a mid-fifteenth century book of hours that was produced in Flanders for the English market. It is illuminated with twenty historiated initials and forty-seven full or half page miniatures.

Llangibby Castle Collection (NLW MSS 16962-17109) 
In 1939 an extensive selection of manuscript, printed, and graphic material from the Llangibby Castle Library was placed on permanent deposit in the National Library. These collections, which belonged to Major Albert Addams-Williams, are mostly associated with history and people of Monmouthshire.

Groups of manuscripts in the General Collection 
The General Collection includes the following groups of manuscripts:

References

Further reading 
 Davies, J. H. (1921) Catalogue of Manuscripts Vol. 1. Additional Manuscripts in the Collections of Sir John Williams. Aberystwyth: The National Library of Wales.
 Ethé, H. (1916) Catalogue of Oriental Manuscripts, Persian Arabic, and Hindūstānī. Aberystwyth: The National Library of Wales.

National Library of Wales collections
Welsh manuscripts
Welsh books